A guaranteed maximum price (also known as GMP, not-to-exceed price, NTE, or NTX) contract is a cost-type contract (also known as an open-book contract) such that the contractor is compensated for actual costs incurred plus a fixed fee, limited to a maximum price. The contractor is responsible for cost overruns greater than the guaranteed maximum price, unless the GMP has been increased by a formal change order (only as a result of additional scope from the client, not price overruns, errors, or omissions). Savings resulting from unexpectedly low costs are returned to the client. 

This is different from a fixed-price contract, also known as stipulated price contract  or lump-sum contract, whereby cost savings are typically retained by the contractor and essentially become additional profits.

See also
 Time and materials

References

Pricing